The Men's slalom competition of the Squaw Valley 1960 Olympics was held on February 24 at Squaw Valley.

The defending world champion was Josl Rieder of Austria.

During the event, race officials asked CBS if they could review videotape of the race because of a controversy about one skier who was alleged to have missed a gate. This gave CBS producers the idea to invent instant replay.

Results

References 

Men's slalom
Winter Olympics